Three ships of the United States Navy have borne the name Avenge.

 , was renamed Assertive on 23 May 1941.
 , was an Accentor-class minesweeper, launched in 1942 and struck in 1946.
 , was an Aggressive-class minesweeper, launched in 1953 and struck in 1970.

Sources

See also
 
 

United States Navy ship names